Thailand has set targets and policies for the development of its energy sector for 2035, with priority being given to indigenous renewable energy resources, including hydropower.

Hydropower in Thailand is the biggest form of renewable energy in Thailand, beating solar power in Thailand and wind power in Thailand, with a total capacity of over 7000 megawatts (MW) of hydropower generation capacity installed in 26 hydroelectric dams in the country. The biggest hydroelectric dam in Thailand is the Bhumibol Dam, which has eight turbines giving it a total capacity of 749 MW. The dam was opened in 1964 and is owned and operated by the Electricity Generating Authority of Thailand (EGAT). As of 2000, large-scale hydropower generation in Thailand had reached almost 3 gigawatts (GW), and development has since slowed as concerns were raised on environmental impacts of large hydropower plants. Generation from small-scale hydropower is rising at a modest rate.

Thailand also imports electricity produced by hydroelectric power stations in other countries. By September 2015, Thailand was importing 7% of the electricity it could produce. Electricity was being imported from Laos, Myanmar and China.

To complement Thailand's hydropower plants, EGAT plans to build floating solar-hydro projects on eight reservoir dams around the country, with a total planned capacity of 1 GW.

List of Thailand hydroelectric power stations

See also
Renewable energy in Thailand
Wind power in Thailand
Solar power in Thailand
Renewable energy by country

References